Dilipa morgiana, the golden emperor, is a species of butterfly of the family Nymphalidae. It is found in India (Arunachal Pradesh, Assam, Himachal Pradesh, Jammu and Kashmir, Nagaland, Sikkim, Uttaranchal), Nepal, northern Myanmar and Vietnam.

The wingspan is 70–82 mm. Adults are rich golden brown with a golden-yellow medial and postdiscal band. There are three generations per year, with adults on wing in March, June and from August to October.

Adults visit over-ripe fruits like apricot, peach and mango and are attracted to Buddleia blossoms.

References

External links 
 Butterflies of India

Apaturinae
Butterflies described in 1850
Butterflies of Indochina